Georges Villeneuve (20 February 1922 – 17 February 2020) was a Liberal party member of the House of Commons of Canada.

After school studies in Saint-Prime, then at the seminaries in Chicoutimi and Nicolet, Villeneuve began law studies in 1946 at Université Laval in Quebec City. After his graduation in 1949, he was granted status as a notary and opened a practice in Mistassini that August.

Villeneuve was first elected at the Roberval riding in the 1953 general election then re-elected for one more term in 1957. He was defeated in the 1958 election by Jean-Noël Tremblay of the Progressive Conservative party. Villeneuve made two further unsuccessful attempts to win back Roberval in 1962 and 1965.

From 1961 to 1968, Villeneuve was mayor of Mistassini. He continued his notary practice until his retirement in 1985.

References

External links
 

1922 births
2020 deaths
Liberal Party of Canada MPs
Mayors of places in Quebec
Members of the House of Commons of Canada from Quebec
Quebec notaries
Université Laval alumni
People from Saguenay–Lac-Saint-Jean
French Quebecers